John Christian Kaiminoeauloamekaikeokekumupaa "Kaimi" Fairbairn (born January 29, 1994) is an American football placekicker for the Houston Texans of the National Football League (NFL). Playing college football at UCLA, he was a consensus first-team All-American as a senior, when he was also awarded the Lou Groza Award as the nation's top college kicker in 2015. After winning the kicking position as a true freshman, Fairbairn became the Pac-12 Conference record holder for the most career points scored. Undrafted out of college, he signed with Houston as a free agent and was named their starting kicker the following year in 2017.

Early life
Fairbairn was born in Kailua, Hawaii, to John and Rochelle Fairbairn. Since he was a kid, he has gone by the name Kaʻimi, forgoing John Christian. In Hawaiian, his name means "seeker of wisdom". "The meaning of your name is your life," Fairbairn said. "Hawaiians have a long ancestry. It's really meaningful for me to go by my Hawaiian name."

As a youngster, he was a kicker in football, but preferred catching the football instead. He attended high school at Punahou School, where he was a two-sport star in football and soccer. Playing central defender in soccer, he was a two-time first-team all-state player, and the team won two state championships.

Fairbairn did not initially play football at Punahou. He did not envision a future in the sport, and tried out for water polo instead. After almost drowning, he realized he was not a proficient swimmer and returned to football. As a sophomore, Fairbairn was named second-team all-state, and he earned first-team all-state as a junior and senior. He was teammates with DeForest Buckner. Fairbairn was ranked nationally as the No. 4 recruit at kicker coming out of high school.

College career
Fairbairn won the kicking job at UCLA as a true freshman in 2012,  and he became the first Bruin to score at least 100 points in each of his four seasons. His career got off to an inauspicious start when his first two extra points were blocked against Rice. He became a dependable kicker from close range, but struggled from distance. In the Pac-12 Championship Game that year, he missed a 52-yard field goal with 30 seconds remaining in a 27–24 loss to Stanford. With a wet field and a poor snap by Kevin McDermott, UCLA coach Jim Mora said: "We put [Fairbairn] in a tough situation there." In his junior year in 2014, UCLA was trailing Utah 30–28 when Fairbairn missed a 55-yard attempt as time expired. However, the Utes were penalized for running into the kicker, providing him a chance at a 50-yard field goal, which missed just wide right.

Entering the 2015 season, the senior Fairbairn was 11 for 22 on field-goal tries of 40 yards or more. On October 3 against Arizona State, he made a 53-yard field goal, the first successful 50-plus yarder of his career after missing his first five. The kick cut the Sun Devils lead to 15–10 at the half, but the Bruins lost the game 38–23. In a 40–24 win over California on October 22, Fairbairn had a 55-yarder called off because UCLA was penalized for a false start.  With seconds left in the first half, Mora was initially going to have the offense try a Hail Mary pass. However, Fairbairn was given another opportunity, which he converted for a UCLA record 60-yard field goal. It was the first 60-yard field goal in the Football Bowl Subdivision since 2012. On November 14, Fairbairn made four field goals against Washington State to set the Pac-12 record for most career points, breaking former Bruins kicker John Lee's previous mark of 390 (1982–1985).

He finished the regular season having made 20 of 23 field goal attempts, including a perfect 16 of 16 from inside 40 yards and four from beyond 40. Fairbairn was awarded the Lou Groza Award, given annually to the nation's top college kicker. He was a near unanimous first-team All-American, earning first-team honors from all the official selectors except Sporting News, who named him to their second-team. However, he was only named second-team All-Pac-12. In the Foster Farms Bowl, he missed a 46-yard field goal in a 37–29 loss to Nebraska. His career ended with three straight misses, including previous failed attempts of 49 yards at Utah and 47 at USC.

Professional career

After not being selected in the 2016 NFL Draft, Fairbairn signed with the Houston Texans. However, he spent all of 2016 on injured reserve with an injured quadriceps. In 2017, he was named the Texans' starting kicker over Nick Novak.  Fairbairn had attempted all of the team's field goals during the preseason, and he had a stronger leg and deeper kickoffs than the incumbent. In Week 4, against the Tennessee Titans, he converted six-of-seven extra points and all three field goal attempts. As a rookie, he converted 32 of 35 extra point attempts and 20 of 25 field goal attempts.

In Week 15 of the 2018 season, Fairbairn kicked five field goals and two extra points in a 29–22 win over the New York Jets, earning him AFC Special Teams Player of the Week. He earned AFC Special Teams Player of the Month for December. On the season, Fairbairn did not miss a kick inside of 40 yards and led the league in points scored (150), field goals made (37)—which was also a franchise record—and field goals attempted (42). The Texans won the AFC South with a 11–5 record. In the Wild Card Round against the Indianapolis Colts, he converted one extra point in his playoff debut, a 21–7 loss.

On March 11, 2019, the Texans placed a second-round restricted free agent tender on Fairbairn. He began the 2019 season slowly while adjusting to a new holder, punter Bryan Anger, who replaced Trevor Daniel. Fairbairn made his last seven field goals to finish the season connecting on 20 of 25 field goals and 40 of 45 extra points. In the first round of the playoffs, he made a game-winning 28-yard field goal with 3:20 left in overtime for a 22–19 win over the Buffalo Bills.

On March 10, 2020, Fairbairn was signed to a four-year, $17.65 million contract by the Texans.

On September 8, 2021, Fairbairn was placed on injured reserve. He was activated on October 2, 2021. On December 12, 2021, Fairbairn made a career-long 61-yard field goal vs. the Seahawks, which also set a Texans' franchise record for longest field goal made.

NFL career statistics

Regular season

Postseason

Source:

References

External links

Houston Texans bio
UCLA Bruins bio

1994 births
Living people
People from Honolulu County, Hawaii
American football placekickers
Players of American football from Hawaii
Punahou School alumni
UCLA Bruins football players
All-American college football players
Houston Texans players
American people of Native Hawaiian descent